Trüllikon is a municipality in the district of Andelfingen in the canton of Zürich in Switzerland.

Geography

Of this area, 63.1% is used for agricultural purposes, 29.4% is forested, 7.3% is settled (buildings or roads), and the remainder (0.2%) is non-productive (rivers, glaciers or mountains).

Demographics
, 5.4% of the population was made up of foreign nationals. Over the last 10 years the population has decreased at a rate of -0.3%. Most of the population speaks German  (94.6%), with Italian being second most common ( 0.7%) and Serbo-Croatian being third ( 0.6%).

In the 2007 election the most popular party was the SVP which received 52% of the vote.  The next three most popular parties were the SPS (14.7%), the Green Party (10.8%) and the FDP (7.3%).

The age distribution of the population is children and teenagers (0–19 years old) make up 23.5% of the population, while adults (20–64 years old) make up 64% and seniors (over 64 years old) make up 12.5%.  In Trüllikon about 79.8% of the population (between age 25-64) have completed either non-mandatory upper secondary education or additional higher education (either university or a Fachhochschule).

Trüllikon has an unemployment rate of 1.53%.  , there were 141 people employed in the primary economic sector and about 39 businesses involved in this sector; 64 people are employed in the secondary sector and there are 14 businesses in this sector; 90 people are employed in the tertiary sector, with 26 businesses in this sector.

References

External links

 Official website 

Municipalities of the canton of Zürich